AUTOart is a Hong Kong-based diecast model car line manufactured by Gateway Autoart Ltd. and sold by AA Collection Ltd.

History
AUTOart was established in 1998. Other lines of diecast vehicles formerly associated with AUTOart were Gateway, Gate and UT Models. The latter was originally a German company with diecast cars made in China and associated with Paul's Model Art which produces Minichamps. AUTOart makes diecast and composite (ABS + diecast) model cars, and diecast motorcycles. The car models have been divided over time into various series, including the Millennium series, Performance series, Signature series and the Composite series.

AUTOart Design offers offbeat automobilia like 'shock absorber' pens, carbon fiber tissue boxes, or ashtray and clock in the form of a disc brake rotor with caliper.

Models

AUTOart has produced more than 45 different car marques in nine different scales. Sizes generally range from 1:64 scale (2 to 3 inches long) to 1:12 scale (about 12 to 14 inches). Wheels & tires, carpeting, seat belts, door handles, engines, suspension, even sun visors and door/hood/trunk lid dampers are reproduced. As an example, the company's 1:18 scale 1971 Mustang featured accurate details down to engine wiring, underside hood insulation, wood grain inserts in the doors, and authentically detailed brake and accelerator pedals. The 1:18 scale 1941 Willys military Jeep features accurate weld rivets, shaped reflectors, wood shovel and ax, tied whip antenna, and accurate period dashboard labels. Dennis Doty, an authority on models of all kinds, and a contributor to Collectible Automobile Magazine, calls AUTOart models "truly spectacular".

Many AUTOart models are of exotic racing, sports, or super performance vehicles like the white, red, and blue BMW 3.0 CSL 1973 winner at Spa, or the Showroom Stock 2007 Mustang Road Racer, but more mundane vehicles like the New Beetle or the Chrysler PT Cruiser are also produced. One interesting example is the 1989 Jeep Grand Wagoneer, a car offered by Kaiser, AMC, and Chrysler over a period of twenty-five years. Featured on it were accurate and realistic period wheels, turn signals, roof rack, vinyl 'wood' siding, and a working tailgate.

The AUTOart line favors, but is not limited to, European vehicles. One example reviewed in Hemmings Sports & Exotic Car was the company's 1970 Lamborghini Espada 2+2 which the magazine saw as a good model choice – distinct from the plethora of model Countaches or Diablos. Thus AUTOart features both new vehicles, like the C7 Corvette or Lamborghini Veneno, as well as vintage racing cars like the 1965 Formula 1 Honda raced at Monaco. Historic racing cars have also included a number of other Can Am and Grand Prix cars from the 1960s and 1970s. The earliest years of actual vehicles represented in the line-up are from about 1938, with the BMW 328 Mille Miglia. American Ford Crown Vic Police Interceptors and British "Humberside Police" Subaru Imprezas along with a Mercedes-Benz E220 Berlin taxi are examples that show the company includes professional vehicles alongside stock and race cars. Additionally, several Italian Vespa scooters have been offered.

Australian market Holdens and Chryslers are also featured, but here another firm comes into play. Biante Model Cars of Australia were made in the AUTOart factory in China with several models boxed under both names. Biante was the company of Trevor Young, who died in 2006.

More recently, AUTOart has also produced TV and film tie-in vehicles, like the Mad Max Road Warrior 1973 Australian Ford Falcon Interceptor driven by Mel Gibson, the Gulf Porsche 917 driven by Steve McQueen in the movie LeMans, or the Toyota Trueno from the anime show Initial D. All of these were offered in 1:18 scale. The Mad Max car was also offered in 1:43.

Autoart is moving towards replicating cars in composite plastic and with diecast interior instead of a traditional diecast body and plastic chassis. The company claims that the move towards plastic should result in more accurate details, such as panel lines, as well as the models costing less than their diecast counterparts.

Promotionals
AUTOart models marketed under the Gateway/Gate label are often of more common brands and more likely to be found in retail stores or as dealer promotionals. As an example, when the Saturn VUE SUV was introduced mid-2002, AUTOart was selected by General Motors to provide a detailed 1:18 scale dealership promotional model. It was packaged in Saturn logo boxes, usually painted metallic burnt orange – the same paint used on the actual car. Hood, tailgate, and front doors all opened. This practice of providing a larger metal model with opening parts and made in China was significantly different than the previous use of Detroit area plastic companies used for promotional models and products.

Despite promotionals with many opening parts, one AUTOart line, their 1:18 "Motorsports" series has been criticized for having none, yet with no break in price. The company has defended their product by saying that Motorsports teams are ever more sensitive about releasing photos that might give away interior, suspension and engine bay details to their racing competitors, yet they must develop and produce marketing models for motorsports teams within short time frames. Thus, these models have sealed bodies with few or no opening parts.

Legal issues
In 2004, a lawsuit in Hong Kong courts was initiated against UT Models and Gateway Global and Gateway Hong Kong by the plaintiff, Paul's Model Art of Germany (known mostly for marketing Minichamps). Paul's Model Art claimed that it had rights to the sole distribution of certain models in Germany and that UT Models had used Gateway for new offerings to circumvent this deal. At this time the lawsuit between AUTOArt's parent company, Gateway Global, and Paul's Model Art is still ongoing, but seems to be leaning in Gateway's favor.

References

Footnotes

External links
AUTOart Home Page
AUTOart German Home Page
AUTOart Diecast

Companies with year of establishment missing
Model manufacturers of China
Manufacturing companies of Hong Kong
Die-cast toys
1:43 scale models
1:18 scale models
Model cars